Middletown Regional Airport, also known as Hook Field,  is a city-owned public-use airport located two nautical miles (3.7 km) north of the central business district of Middletown, a city in Butler County, Ohio, United States. The airport was renamed in October 2008; it was previously known as Hook Field Municipal Airport.

In late August 2008 the airport gained some national prominence when the Republican vice presidential nominee Sarah Palin flew into Hook to later attend a Dayton campaign rally where she was announced as Senator John McCain's running mate.

Facilities and aircraft 
It has two runways: 5/23 is 6,100 by 100 feet (1,859 x 30 m) with an asphalt pavement; 8/26 is 3,040 by 297 feet (927 x 91 m) with a turf surface. It has the longest runway of any non-towered airport in southwest Ohio.

For the 12-month period ending October 1, 2007, the airport had 40,050 aircraft operations, an average of 109 per day: 91% general aviation, 9% air taxi, and <% military. At that time there were 84 aircraft based at this airport: 95% single-engine, 1% multi-engine, 2% jet and 1% helicopter.

References

External links 
 B&B Aero Services, the airport's fixed-base operator (FBO)
 

Airports in Ohio
Middletown, Ohio
Transportation buildings and structures in Butler County, Ohio